The Mpanga Central Forest Reserve is a  Forest Reserve in Uganda. It is a small patch of natural equatorial rainforest covering . It is situated in Mpigi District, Mpambire,  37 km southwest of Kampala City. Onsite is Mpanga Forest Resort managed by Global Afric Safaris since 2018.

Location 
Mpanga Central Forest Reserve is in the Central Region of Uganda, Mpigi District , Mpabire, to be exact. By road, it is 37 km Southwest of Kampala City. It can easily be accessed through a 1hour drive along the main Kampala – Masaka Highway.This makes Mpanga Central Forest Reserve the closest natural equatorial rainforest to the Capital City.

How do I get to Mpanga Central Forest Reserve? 
Method 1

 Call Global Afric Safaris at +256782996126 to make a Booking.
 Make any preparation payments such as Food or Accommodation.
 For traveling, you can contact Global Afic Safaris to arrange for you suitable transportation to the site. If you can manage your transportation, set out for Mpigi using the Kampala-Masaka Highway either by private or public means.
Once you have reached Mpigi Town, take big breathe of relief because you have almost reached your destination. Call +256782996126 to give the simple directs of the 1km road off the main road to the site.
Note

A compulsory entrance fee of $1.00 / One United States Dollar or its equivalent is required.

History 
It was small patch of natural rainforest that was protected by the Government of Uganda as a scientific research site since 1953. According to its neighboring farmsteads, it belonged to a wealthy family which carried the name Mpanga. It was actually name after the rich families son, Mpanga.

Ecology 
It supports an impressive biodiversity for such a small forest! It has 500 species of trees and shrubs, 300 species of birds, 97 butterflies, and 112 moths. Three species of monkeys can be seen in the forest including vervet, red-tailed and black and white colobus monkey. There is also a number of small mammals including banded mongoose, squirrels, pottos, pangolines and bushabies. If you spend a night at Mpanga Forest you have a chance of spotting the rare nocturnal pottos and bushbabies.

The dominant tree species in Mpanga Forest is the hard and weather resistant Celtis. Mpanga Forest is surrounded by a community of traditional drum makers who look for the soft trees that are suitable for the drum making, and therefore the undesirable hard Celtis trees have so much saved the forest from exploitation by the drum makers. The communities however do still depend on the forest for firewood, charcoal and medicinal hubs.

Activities 

The activities are divided to two major categories namely;

Forest Activities

Forest Trails are well developed into four main routings namely: The Baseline Trail, the Hornbill Trail, the Butterfly Trail to best suite these activities;

 Nature Walks  
 Bird Watching and Identification
 Primate Watching 
 Butterfly Identification
 Walk Racing
 Dirt Biking
 Mountain Cycling
 Hiking
 Running
 Camping

Leisure Activities 

These are done available for those not yet ready for the forest;
Community Led Activities
SDG Village. An NGO called Climate Smart Youth Action Network (CSYAN) is implementing an SDG model Village as a community-led initiative for promoting climate-smart action around the forest boundaries. Peniel Rwendeire the Technical Advisor for CSAYN discovered such a need in 2020 during the lockdown and has been mobilizing different stakeholders to be part of the initiative.(http://www.csyan.org/)

 Silent Disco
 Volley Ball
 Board games
Campfire
Photography
Videography

After having fun, take a chill and enjoy a tasty meal by Global Afric Safaris' Taza cafe

External links 
www.globalafricsafris.com

References 

Forests of Uganda
Forest reserves of Uganda